Geek Pop was an online music festival featuring artists inspired by science, established in 2008. In the first festival, hosted by the website Null Hypothesis: The Journal of Unlikely Science, attendees were only able to download a podcast featuring songs about science as a radio-style festival report. After 2009, the festival moved to its website where listeners could listen to music for free and download radio-style report podcasts called the "highlights podcast". The Geek Pop website would also produces a monthly podcast, and has hosted live events. As of June 2016, the festival and website are no longer active.

Background
Online festivals first began in 2003 at the Exposure Festival. Online festivals had a set launch time, but did not happen in a fixed location. They were available online after their launch date.

Similar to festivals, online festivals had a set time and celebrated a particular aspect of a community, albeit an online community. The emergence of social media has enabled online festivals to allow people to communicate to each other during online festivals. At Geek Pop festivals, this communication was primarily achieved through an online "bar", which used Twitter on the website to show tweets about Geek Pop.

There are environmental benefits to having an online festival as opposed to, or in conjunction with, a real festival. Half of the acts that played in 2008 were from overseas, but no carbon was used to "bring" them to a primarily UK audience. There is no litter or waste generated by the festival and the majority of the marketing is done online, reducing the amount of paper needed.

Geek Pop '08

Song List
 Amateur Transplants – Anaesthetist's Hymn
 Jonny Berliner – Dark Matter
 Let's Tea Party – Reptiles
 Down with Gender – The Robot Island
 Tales from the Birdbath – The Scientist
 Logan Wright - Zero
 Photomixers – Hotel Mauna Kea
 Professor Science featuring Athena Currier – Sweet Home Apparatus
 Emily Schulman – Dinosaur Extinction

Media recognition
Geek Pop '08 was mentioned during podcasts from the Guardian and Nature, receiving positive reviews from both – "There were many highlights, but [our] pick of the bunch [is] Dark Matter by science troubadour Johnny Berliner", said Nature. Laboratory Talk said that, "this virtual festival has much to commend it… My personal highpoint was the aching rendition of Hotel Mauna Kea by the Photomixers, demonstrating simultaneously pathos, humour, and even a little musical talent." Since March 2008 it has also been featured on Australia's Diffusion Science Radio's 2008 Christmas Special as well as the Mr Science Show.

Geek Pop '09
Geek Pop '09 was launched on the 6 March 2009. Alongside the two virtual stages imagined in the podcast from the previous year, the reproductive stage and the Tesla Tent, the festival introduced a new main stage which will be called the Tetrahedron stage (in homage to Glastonbury's Pyramid stage). The major difference for the 2009 festival from the previous year was its relocation to a standalone website and the introduction of an interactive festival map that allowed listeners to choose songs to listen to.

Geek Pop 2010
Geek Pop 2010 occurred on 12–21 March 2010 and featured a 5th virtual stage for science comedy, named the Comical Flask. There were also two live performances, one in Bristol in the Cube Microplex, and one in London in The Miller.

Notable acts that contributed to the online festival and live events include Baba Brinkman, Dr Stuart Clark as Dr. Stu and the Neutron Stars, Bert Miller & the Animal Folk, Dr. Martin Austwick from Answer Me This! podcast as The Sound of the Ladies and Jonny Berliner.

Baba Brinkman's "Rationalist Anthem" Off That appeared exclusively as part of Geek Pop 2010, featuring a video animated by Tommy Nagle.

Geek Pop 2011
The launch of Geek Pop 2011 coincided again with The British Science Association National Science and Engineering Week. The online festival went live on the 11 March 2011 and a live launch gig occurred at Wilton's Music Hall in London on the 10 March 2011. The festival featured music from Jeffrey Lewis, Amateur Transplants, Dr. Martin Austwick, Helen Arney and Jonny Berliner. The Amateur Transplants, Martin Austwick and Helen Arney all performed live at the Wilton's Music Hall launch gig.

For the first time, some of the music was available for purchase only, on a mini album called Geek Like Me.

Geek Like Me - Track Listing
 "Animals" by Helen Arney with Mr Simmonds featuring Professor Elemental – 4:01
 "An Element Sends a Postcard Home" by Spirit of Play – 3:08
 "The Day of the Snail" by The Sound of the Ladies – 4:12
 "Radio Gagarin" by Karmadillo – 4:23
 "DNA (The Genetics Calypso)" by Jonny Berliner – 2:49
 Brokeback Workbench" by MJ Hibbett and Vom Vorton – 2:47

Geek Pop 2012
There was no Geek Pop festival in 2012 due to other commitments from the organizers, Jim Bell and Hayley Birch.

References

External links
 Geek Pop Website
 The 2008 festival site, Null Hypothesis
 News coverage at the British Science Association
 News coverage at the Plus Math Magazine 

British music websites